The Piaggio Zip is a scooter that is manufactured by Piaggio. All Zip models have a CVT automatic transmission, sometimes referred to as a twist & go transmission due to its lack of gears and use of an automatic centrifugal clutch, sharing several components with other models in the range. Several companies such as Malossi, Polini and PM Tuning offer an extensive catalogue of tuning parts for the 50 cc and 125  models.

History
The first generation Zip was only available as a  two stroke.  The base Zip model was air-cooled, with early models equipped with drum brakes front and rear. The Zip SP model was water-cooled and had single sided front suspension. The fuel tank had a capacity of  A  machine based on the Zip SP with a  Malossi equipped engine was raced by a young Leon Haslam to win the 1997 Gilera Scooter Championship title.

In 2000 Piaggio introduced a redesigned Zip model range. These are sometimes referred to as the Zip 2000 or Zip Cat models. It had a height adjustable seat, lockable glove box and underseat storage with room for a full face helmet.

The base 50 cc version was once again a two-stroke but the engine was now the updated Hi-Per2 unit. The Zip SP had the water-cooled Hi-Per2 Pro engine and single sided front suspension. In the UK the 50 cc models were sold in restricted form to comply with moped licence regulations. The restriction was done by the use of a washer to prevent the variator from using its full range and a blank pipe from the exhaust to reduce power. The Zip model was the best selling powered two wheeled vehicle (by registrations) in the UK in 2001.

In addition to the two two-stroke variants a four stroke  model was also made available. The Zip 125 had an air-cooled two-valve variant of the Piaggio group's LEADER (Low Emissions ADvanced Engine Range) engine. The 125 model was also equipped with side lights.

In late 2005 a four stroke Hi-Per4 equipped 49 cc Zip 50 4t was announced. The 4t was restricted for some markets via electronics, a washer in the front transmission pulley and a smaller main jet.

A four-stroke  model, the Zip 100, was made available in March 2006 in some markets.

Specifications

References

External links

 Official website

Zip
Motor scooters
Mopeds
Motorcycles introduced in 1995
Two-stroke motorcycles